South Carolina Highway 177 may refer to:

South Carolina Highway 177, a state highway from Wallace to the North Carolina state line near Wallace
South Carolina Highway 177 (1930–1936), a former state highway in the Spartanburg area
South Carolina Highway 177 (1938–1951), a former state highway from near Whitmire to near Ballentine

177 (disambiguation)